This is a list of groups, organizations, and festivals that recognize achievements in cinema, usually by awarding various prizes. The awards sometimes also have popular unofficial names (such as the "Oscar" for Hollywood's Academy Awards), which are mentioned if applicable. Many awards are simply identified by the name of the group presenting the award. 

Awards have been divided into four major categories: critics' awards, voted on (usually annually) by a group of critics; festival awards, awards presented to the best film shown in a particular film festival; industry awards, which are selected by professionals working in some branch of the movie industry; and audience awards, which are voted by the general public.

Critics' awards

International
 FIPRESCI (Fédération Internationale de la PRESse CInématographique) Awards, given by the International Federation of Film Critics at various film festivals
Cannes Film Festival (Cannes film festival) is one of the most important and selective film festivals with their prestigious prize the Palme d'Or.
 OFCS (Online Film Critics Society) Awards
 Hollywood Foreign Press Association
 Golden Globe Awards
 IOFCP (International Online Film Critics' Poll) Awards

Argentina
 Asociación de Cronistas Cinematográficos de la Argentina
 Premios Cóndor de Plata
 Premios Clarín Espectáculos
 Konex Awards

Australia
 ATOM Awards
 Australian Film Critics Association (AFCA)
 AWGIE Awards (AWG)
 Film Critics Circle of Australia (FCCA)
 Inside Film Awards (IF Awards)
 South Australian Screen Awards
 Western Union Short Film Competition

Bangladesh
 Meril Prothom Alo Awards
 National Film Awards

Belgium
 Belgian Film Critics Association (UCC)

Brazil
 Festival de Gramado
 Grande Prêmio do Cinema Brasileiro

Canada
 Toronto Film Critics Association (TFCA)
 Vancouver Film Critics Circle (VFCC)

Czech Republic
 Czech Film Critics' Awards
 Trilobit Awards

Denmark
 Bodil Awards from Danish Film Critics Association
 Lauritzen Award

France
 Etoiles du Parisien
 French Syndicate of Cinema Critics
 Globes de Cristal Award
 Louis Delluc Prize

Germany
 Award of the German Film Critics Association 

Hong Kong
 Hong Kong Film Critics Society Awards

India
 Aravindan Puraskaram
 Asianet Film Awards
 Bengal Film Journalists' Association Awards
 Bhojpuri Film Awards
 CineMAA Awards
 Cinema Express Awards
 Edison Tamil Awards
 Dadasaheb Phalke Award
 Filmfare Awards
 Filmfare Awards East
 Filmfare Awards South
 Filmfare Marathi Awards
 Filmfare Short Film Awards
 IIFA Utsavam
 International Indian Film Academy Awards
 John Abraham Award
 Karnataka State Film Award
 Kerala Film Critics Association Awards
 Kerala State Film Awards
 Maharashtra State Film Awards
 Nandi Awards
 National Film Awards (Directorate of Film Festivals)
 Odisha State Film Awards
 Padmarajan Award
 Prag Cine Awards
 Rajasthan Film Festival
 RED FM Tulu Film Awards
 Santosham Film Awards
 SIIMA Short Film Awards
 Screen Awards
 South Indian International Movie Awards
 Stardust Awards
 Tamil Nadu State Film Awards
 Udaya Film Awards
 Vanitha Film Awards
 Vijay Awards
 West Bengal Film Journalists' Association Awards
 Zee Cine Awards
 Zee Cine Awards Telugu

Indonesia
 Citra Awards
 Maya Awards

Ireland
 Dublin Film Critics' Circle

Italy
 Nastro d'Argento
 Globo d'oro
 David di Donatello

Japan
 Japanese Movie Critics Awards

Lebanon 
 The Lebanese Cinema Movie Guide Awards

Mexico
 Ariel Award
 Diosas de Plata

Myanmar
 Myanmar Motion Picture Academy Awards
 Star Awards

Nigeria 
 Africa Magic Viewers' Choice Awards
 Africa Movie Academy Awards

Pakistan
 ARY Film Awards

Philippines
 Gawad Urian
 Young Critics Circle Film Desk Awards
 Gawad PASADO
 Gawad TANGLAW
 Gawad Genio Awards
 The Entertainment Editors' Choice Awards

Portugal
 Golden Globes (Portugal)

South Korea
 Korean Association of Film Critics Awards
 Busan Film Critics Awards

Spain
 CEC Medals
 Premios Goya
 Feroz Awards
 Fotogramas de Plata

Turkey
 SIYAD Awards of Turkish Film Critics Association (SİYAD)
 Flying Broom International Women's Film Festival (Uçan Süpürge Kadın Filmleri Festivali)
 International Adana Golden Boll Film Festival (Adana Altın Koza Film Festivali)
 International Adana Film Festival (Uluslararası Adana Film Festivali)
 Istanbul Animation Festival (İstanbul Animasyon Festivali)

United Kingdom
 ODEON National Youth Film Awards
 National Film Awards UK
 Evening Standard British Film Awards
 London Film Critics Circle
 National Movie Awards - first one aired September 29, 2007, on ITV
 Film Critics Association UK
 Charity Film Awards

United States
 Alliance of Women Film Journalists
 American Film Institute (AFI)
 Atlanta Film Critics Circle (AFCC)
 Austin Film Critics Association (AFCA)
 Black Film Critics Circle
 Boston Online Film Critics Association
 Boston Society of Film Critics (BSFC)
 Broadcast Film Critics Association (BFCA)
 Central Ohio Film Critics Association
 Chicago Film Critics Association (CFCA)
 Chicago Indie Critics
 Columbus Film Critics Association
 Critics Association Of Central Florida
 Critics' Choice Movie Awards
 Critics' Choice Super Awards
 Dallas-Fort Worth Film Critics Association (DFWFCA)
 Denver Film Critics Society
 Detroit Film Critics Society 
 DiscussingFilm Critic Awards
 Florida Film Critics Circle (FFCC)
 Georgia Film Critics Association (GFCA)
 Golden Raspberry Awards (a.k.a. the Razzies)
 Gotham Awards
 Greater Western New York Film Critics Association
 Hawaii Film Critics Society
 Houston Film Critics Society (HFCS)
 Indiana Film Journalists Association
 Iowa Film Critics Association
 Kansas City Film Critics Circle
 Las Vegas Film Critics Society
 Los Angeles Film Critics Association (LAFCA)
 LAIFFA Awards(Los Angeles Independent Film Festivals)
 Maverick Movie Awards (MMA)
 Music City Film Critics Association
 National Society of Film Critics (NSFC)
 National Board of Review (NBR)
 Nevada Film Critics Society
 New Mexico Film Critics
 New York Film Critics Circle (NYFCC)
 New York Film Critics Online (NYFCO)
 New York Film Awards 
 Nollywood and African Film Critics Awards (NAFCA)
 North Carolina Film Critics Association
 North Dakota Film Society (NDFS)
 North Texas Film Critics Association
 NYU Tisch School of the Arts Wasserman Award
 Oklahoma Film Critics Circle
 Online Association of Female Film Critics
 Online Film Critics Society Awards (OFCS)
 Philadelphia Film Critics Circle Awards
 Phoenix Critics Circle (PCC)
 Phoenix Film Critics Society
 Political Film Society (PFS)
 San Diego Film Critics Society (SDFCS)
 San Francisco Film Critics Circle (SFFCC)
 Seattle Film Critics Society (SFCS)
 Southeastern Film Critics Association
 St. Louis Gateway Film Critics Association (SLGFCA)
 Sunset Circle Awards
 Utah Film Critics Association
 Village Voice Film Poll
 Washington D.C. Area Film Critics Association (WAFCA)
 Women Film Critics Circle
 X-Rated Critics Organization (XRCO) Heart-On Awards

Uruguay
 Uruguayan Film Critics Association Awards 2001

Vietnam
 HCMC Film Association

Significant Festival awards
As of 1998, The Variety Guide to Film Festivals states that "the Triple Crown of international competitive festivals" are Cannes, Venice and Berlin.

Argentina
 Festival Internacional de Cine de Mar del Plata
 Ástor
 BAFICI (Buenos Aires Festival Internacional de Cine Independiente)

Armenia
 Golden Apricot Yerevan International Film Festival

Australia
 Flickerfest

Bangladesh
 Dhaka International Film Festival
 Rainbow Award (covering all segments)

Belgium
 Flanders International Film Festival Ghent

Bosnia and Herzegovina
 Sarajevo Film Festival
 Heart of Sarajevo
 Sarajevo Youth Film Festival

Brazil
 Grande Prêmio do Cinema Brasileiro 
 São Paulo International Film Festival

Burkina Faso
 Panafrican Film and Television Festival of Ouagadougou (FESPACO)

Canada
 Atlantic Film Festival
 Cinéfest Sudbury International Film Festival
 Hot Docs Canadian International Documentary Festival
 Inside Out Film and Video Festival
 Montreal World Film Festival
 Toronto International Film Festival
 Vancouver International Film Festival
 Whistler Film Festival
 Yorkton Film Festival

China
 Shanghai International Film Festival
 Beijing International Film Festival

Croatia
 Motovun Film Festival
 Pula Film Festival
 ZagrebDox

Czech Republic
  Karlovy Vary International Film Festival
 Crystal Globe (best picture)
 Special Jury Prize

Egypt
 Cairo International Film Festival
Golden Pyramid Award (best picture)
 Luxor African Film Festival
 Aswan International Women's Film Festival
 Alexandria International Film Festival
 El Gouna Film Festival

France
 Cannes International Film Festival
 Palme d'Or (best picture)
 Grand Prize (best picture runner up)
 Jury Prize
 Prize Un Certain Regard
 Caméra d'Or (best first picture)
 François Chalais Prize
 Trophée Chopard
 Vulcan Award

Germany
 Berlin International Film Festival (Berlinale)
 Golden Bear (best picture)
 Silver Bear (jury grand prize, director, actor and actress)
 Findling Award 

Greece
 International Thessaloniki Film Festival
 Golden Alexander (best picture)

Hungary
 Hungarian Film and TV Awards

India
 International Film Festival of India
Golden Peacock for Best Film
Golden Peacock for Best Short Film
Silver Peacock for Best Film
IFFI Best Director Award
IFFI Best Actor Award (Male)
IFFI Best Actor Award (Female)
IFFI ICFT UNESCO Gandhi Medal
IFFI Satyajit Ray Lifetime Achievement Award
IFFI Indian Film Personality of the Year Award
 International Film Festival of Kerala
 Golden Crow Pheasant
 Mumbai International Film Festival
 Golden Conch (best fiction and best documentary)

Indonesia 
 Bali International Film Festival
 Bandung Film Festival
 Indonesian Film Festival
 Jakarta International Film Festival
 Jogja-NETPAC Asian Film Festival

Iran
 Fajr International Film Festival
 Hafez Awards

Italy
 Venice International Film Festival
 Golden Lion (best picture)
 Coppa Volpi (best actor and actress)
 Rome Film Festival
 Capri Hollywood International Film Festival
Ischia International Film & Music Festival  
 Taormina Film Fest
 Giffoni Film Festival

Japan
 Tokyo International Film Festival

Morocco
 International Film Festival of Marrakech

Netherlands
 Cinekid Festival
 Film by the Sea
 Netherlands Film Festival
 Rembrandt Award
 SCENECS International Debut Film Festival
 ShortCutz Amsterdam

Nigeria
 Africa International Film Festival (AFRIFF)
 Abuja International Film Festival (AIFF)

Norway
 Norwegian International Film Festival
 Amanda (various categories)
 Tromsø International Film Festival

Pakistan
 Kara Film Festival

Poland
 Gdynia Film Festival
 Polish Film Academy
 International Film Festival of the Art of Cinematography CAMERIMAGE

Portugal
 Fantasporto

Philippines
 Cinemanila International Film Festival
 Cinemalaya Philippine Independent Film Festival
 Cinema One Originals Film Festival
 Metro Manila Film Festival

Russia
 Moscow International Film Festival

South Korea
 Bucheon International Fantastic Film Festival
 Busan International Film Festival
 Seoul Independent Film Festival
 Seoul International Film Festival

Spain
 Málaga Spanish Film Festival ('Biznaga')
 San Sebastián International Film Festival ('Shell')
 Seville European Film Festival ('Giraldillo')
 Sitges International Fantastic Film Festival of Catalonia
 Valladolid International Film Festival ('Spike')

Sweden
 Göteborg Film Festival
 Stockholm International Film Festival

Switzerland
 Locarno International Film Festival
 Neuchâtel International Fantastic Film Festival

Turkey
 Adana International Film Festival
 Antalya Film Festival
 Istanbul Animation Festival
 Istanbul Film Festival

Ukraine
 Odesa International Film Festival

United Kingdom
 BFI London Film Festival
 Sheffield Doc/Fest
 UK Film Festival
 Public Health Film Festival (PHFF)

United States
 Chicago International Film Festival
 Sundance Film Festival
 Hawaii International Film Festival
 Vilcek New American Filmmakers Award
 Seattle International Film Festival
 Golden Space Needle (best picture)
 Slamdance Film Festival

Vietnam
 Hanoi International Film Festival
 Vietnam Film Festival
 Golden Lotus (for Best Picture)

Industry awards

International
 IDA (International Documentary Association) Awards
 Location Managers Guild Awards
 Taurus World Stunt Awards
 Webby Awards
 World Soundtrack Awards

Argentina
 AACCA (Academia de las Artes y Ciencias Cinematográficas de la Argentina)
 Premios Sur

Australia
 AACTA Awards (Australian Academy of Cinema and Television Arts Awards), replaced the AFI Awards (Australian Film Institute Awards)
 Asia Pacific Screen Awards
 Australian Production Design Guild
 Australian Screen Sound Guild
 AWGIE Awards
 Casting Guild of Australia (CGA)
 TV Week Logie Awards

Austria
 Austrian Film Awards

Bangladesh
 National Film Awards (Bangladesh)
 Meril Prothom Alo Awards

Belgium
 Joseph Plateau Awards
 Magritte Awards
 Ensor Awards

Canada
 Academy of Canadian Cinema and Television
 Bijou Awards (1981)
 Canadian Film Awards (1949-1978)
 Canadian Screen Awards (since 2012)
 Genie Awards (1980-2012)
 Alberta Film and Television Awards
 Canadian Society of Cinematographers
 Directors Guild of Canada
 Feminist Porn Awards
 Leo Awards
 Prix Iris

Denmark
 Robert Awards

Estonia
 Estonian Film and Television Awards

Europe
 European Film Academy
 European Film Awards (formerly the Felix)
 Lux Prize (European Parliament LUX Award)

Finland
 Jussi Awards

France
 César Awards
 Lumières Award
 Prix Jean Vigo
 Prix Lumière
 Prix Romy Schneider
 Prix Suzanne Bianchetti
 René Clair Award

Germany
 Bavarian Film Award 
 Bogey Awards
 German Film Award 

Hong Kong
 Asian Film Awards
 Golden Bauhinia Awards
 Hong Kong Film Awards

Ibero-America
 Platino Awards
 Fénix Awards

India
 Filmfare Awards
 Filmfare Awards South
 IIFA Awards
 IIFA Utsavam
 Maharashtra State Film Awards 
 National Film Awards
 Nandi Awards (Andhra Pradesh State Film, Music, Television and Arts Awards)
 Star Screen Awards
 South Indian International Movie Awards
 Zee Cine Awards
 Zee Cine Awards Telugu

Indonesia
 Citra Awards 
 Indonesian Movie Actors Awards
 Maya Awards

Ireland
 IFTA Film & Drama Awards

Israel
 Israeli Academy of Film and Television
 Ophir Awards

Italy
 David di Donatello Awards

Japan
 Blue Ribbon Awards
 Hochi Film Award
 Japan Academy Prize
 Mainichi Film Awards
 Nikkan Sports Film Award

Latvia
 Lielais Kristaps

Lithuania
 Sidabrinė gervė

Mexico
 Ariel Award

Nigeria
 Africa Movie Academy Awards, popularly known as AMAA and the AMA Awards
 Nollywood Movies Network
 Nollywood Movies Awards (NMA)
 Best of Nollywood Awards (BON)

Pakistan
 Lux Style Awards
 Hum Awards 
 ARY Film Awards

Philippines
 FAMAS Awards
 Film Academy of the Philippines
 Luna Awards
 Star Awards for Movies

Poland
 Polish Film Awards

Portugal
 Sophia Awards

Romania
 Gopo Awards

Russia
 Nika Award
 Golden Eagle Award
 Russian National Movie Awards

South Africa
 South African Film and Television Awards

South Korea
 Blue Dragon Film Awards
 Buil Film Awards
 Chunsa Film Art Awards
 Director's Cut Awards
 Grand Bell Awards
 Baeksang Arts Awards
 Wildflower Film Awards

Spain
 Actors and Actresses Union Awards
 Berlanga Awards
 Forqué Awards
 Gaudí Awards
 Goya Awards
 Mestre Mateo Awards

Sweden
 Guldbagge Awards

Taiwan
 Golden Horse Awards
 Taipei Film Awards

Thailand
 Suphannahong National Film Awards

Turkey
 Yeşilçam Award

United Kingdom
 British Academy of Film and Television Arts (BAFTA)
 British Academy Film Awards
 British Independent Film Awards

United States
 Academy of Motion Picture Arts and Sciences
 Academy Awards, popularly known as the Oscars
 Academy of Science Fiction, Fantasy and Horror Films
 Saturn Awards
 American Choreography Awards
 American Cinema Editors Golden Reels
 American Society of Cinematographers
 Art Directors Guild
 ASCAP (American Society of Composers, Authors, and Publishers) Film and Television Awards
 AVN (Adult Video News) Awards
 GayVN Awards
 BMI Film Music Awards
 Cinema Audio Society
 Costume Designers Guild
 Directors Guild of America Awards
 Film Your Issue College Film Awards
 Golden Globe Awards
 Golden Reel Award for excellence in sound editing in film and television 
 Gotham Awards – Independent Feature Project
 Hollywood Film Awards
 Hollywood Makeup and Hairstylist Guild
 The Hollywood Reporter Key Art Awards
 Independent Spirit Awards
 International Animated Film Society / ASIFA-Hollywood
 Annie Awards
 International Online Cinema Awards
 International Press Academy
 Satellite Awards
 JEIFA Awards
 NAACP
 Image Awards
 Producers Guild of America Awards
 Screen Actors Guild Awards
 ShoWest/National Association of Theatre Owners Convention
 Taurus World Stunt Awards
 Visual Effects Society Awards
 Writers Guild of America, East & Writers Guild of America, West
 Writers Guild of America Award - Link
 Young Artist Awards

Vietnam
 Kite Awards

Audience awards

International
 Webby People's Voice Awards

Austria
 Romy Awards

Bangladesh
 Meril Prothom Alo Awards

Canada
 Constellation Awards

Germany
 Jupiter Award

India
 Filmfare Awards
 Filmfare Awards South
 Vijay Awards
 South Indian International Movie Awards
 Santosham Film Awards

Indonesia
 MTV Indonesia Movie Awards
 Indonesian Box Office Movie Awards
 Indonesian Choice Awards
 Indonesian Movie Actors Awards

Nigeria
 Africa Magic Viewers' Choice Awards

Pakistan
 Lux Style Awards

Poland
 Polish Academy Audience Award

Spain
 GoldSpirit Awards - Soundtracks and film music

United Kingdom
 Empire Awards
 ITV
 National Film Awards UK
Audience Award for Most Popular Show (now retired)
 Public Health Film Festival Audience Award
 SHAFTA Awards

United States
 E!
 Fox
 MTV Movie & TV Awards
 Independent Lens Audience Award
 Nickelodeon
 Kids' Choice Awards Includes both film and other media awards.
 Teen Choice Awards Includes both film and other media awards.
 People's Choice Awards Includes both film and other media awards.

Sources and references 
 IMDB search page for data on hundreds of awards and festivals

See also

 List of television awards
 List of film festivals
 Lists of films
 List of film acting awards
 List of film awards for lead actress
 List of film awards for lead actor 
 List of awards for supporting actor
 List of pornographic film awards
 List of screenwriting awards for film

References

 
Film awards
